The Kuliak languages, also called the Rub languages, are a group of languages spoken by small relict communities in the mountainous Karamoja region of northeastern Uganda.

Nyang'i and Soo are moribund, with 20 and 50 elderly speakers respectively. However, Ik is vigorous and growing.

Word order in Kuliak languages is verb-initial.

Names
The Kuliak languages are also called the Rub languages by Ehret (1981), since Ehret reconstructed "Rub" to mean 'person' in Proto-Kuliak. He suggests that "Kuliak" may actually be a derogatory term used by neighboring Nilotic-speaking peoples to disparage Kuliak speakers as "poor," hence his preference for using Rub instead.  However, Kuliak continues to be the most widely used name, and is preferred by Roger Blench, Terrill Schrock, Sam Beer and other linguists, who note that the name "Kuliak" is not perceived as offensive or pejorative by any Kuliak speakers.

Classification

Internal
Heine (1976) classifies the Kuliak languages as follows. According to Heine (1976), Soo and Nyang'i form a subgroup, Western Kuliak, while Ik stands by itself.

According to Schrock (2015), Dorobo is a spurious language, is not a fourth Kuliak language, and may at most be a dialect of Ik.

External
Bender (1989) had classified the Kuliak languages within the Eastern Sudanic languages. Later, Bender (2000) revised this position by placing Kuliak as basal branch of Nilo-Saharan. Glottolog treats Kuliak as an independent language family and does not accept Nilo-Saharan as a valid language family.

Evolution
Blench notes that Kuliak languages do not have extensive internal diversity and clearly had a relatively recent common ancestor. There are many monosyllabic VC (vowel + consonant) lexical roots in Kuliak languages, which is typologically unusual among Nilo-Saharan languages and is more typical of some Australian languages such as Kunjen. Blench considers these VC roots to have cognates in other Nilo-Saharan languages, and suggests that the VC roots may have been eroded from earlier Nilo-Saharan roots that had initial consonants.

Bernd Heine (1976) has proposed a reconstruction of Proto-Kuliak.

Significant influences from Cushitic languages, and more recently Eastern Nilotic languages, are observable in the vocabulary and phonology of Kuliak languages. Blench notes that Kuliak appears to retain a core of non-Nilo-Saharan vocabulary, suggesting language shift from an indigenous language like that seen in Dahalo.

Numerals

Comparison of numerals in individual languages:

See also
List of Proto-Kuliak reconstructions (Wiktionary)

References

 Heine, Bernd (1976). The Kuliak Languages of Eastern Uganda.  Nairobi: East African Publishing House.
 Laughlin, C. D. (1975). "Lexicostatistics and the Mystery of So Ethnolinguistic Relations" in Anthropological Linguistics 17:325-41.
 Fleming, Harold C. (1982). "Kuliak External Relations: Step One" in Nilotic Studies (Proceedings of the International Symposium on Languages and History of the Nilotic Peoples, Cologne, January 4–6, 1982, Vol 2, 423–478.
 Blench, Roger M. (2006). Archaeology, Language, and the African Past. Lanham: Altamira Press.

Blench, Roger. Segment Reversal in Kuliak and Its Relationship to Nilo-Saharan.

 
Language families
Languages of Uganda